Sergio Zanetti (born 22 November 1967 in Avellaneda, Argentina) is a football manager and former player, who played as a defender, and who is currently in charge of the Internazionale U18 side.

Career
He played for Talleres de Remedios de Escalada, Deportivo Español and Racing Club in Argentina, Cremonese (Italy), Verbania Calcio (Italy), AC Bellinzona (Switzerland) and FC Locarno (Switzerland).

After retirement he turned into a youth team coach (Allievi Nazionali level) for Lombardian clubs such as Pro Sesto, Monza and Como.

Personal life
Zanetti is the older brother of former Inter and Argentina footballer Javier Zanetti.

References

External links
 Argentine Primera statistics  

1967 births
Living people
Argentine footballers
Argentine people of Italian descent
Talleres de Remedios de Escalada footballers
Deportivo Español footballers
Racing Club de Avellaneda footballers
U.S. Cremonese players
Argentine expatriate sportspeople in Spain
Sportspeople from Avellaneda
Argentine expatriate sportspeople in Switzerland
AC Bellinzona players
Expatriate footballers in Spain
FC Locarno players
Expatriate footballers in Switzerland
Association football defenders